Bulletproof is the first album by the 1970s British rock band Hard Stuff. It was released on Purple Records, the Deep Purple-related record label.

It also featured vocalist Harry Shaw, formerly of Curiosity Shoppe (who recorded one single on Dream), but he had left the band by the time of its release and was uncredited. The record sleeve was re-designed to remove Shaw's image (originally shown on the bottom right hand side).

Track listing
"Jay Time" (John Cann) – 2:50
"Sinister Minister" (John Gustafson) – 3:30
"No Witch at All" (Gustafson) – 5:38
"Taken Alive" (Gustafson) – 3:14
"Time Gambler (Rodney)" (Cann) – 6:11
"Millionaire" (Cann) – 6:04
"Monster in Paradise" (Gustafson, Ian Gillan, Roger Glover) – 4:33
"Hobo" (Cann) – 3:25
"Mr. Longevity – RIP" (Gustafson) – 4:35
"The Provider – Part One" (Cann) – 2:31

Bonus tracks (2011 Angel Air issue)
"Jay Time" (single version) (Cann) – 2:36
"The Orchestrator" (Cann, Gustafson) – 3:17

Later releases showed John Cann's name as John Du Cann, as he later became known by this name.

Cover version
The opening track "Jay Time" was covered in 2011 by American rock band White Denim.

"Monster in Paradise" was also recorded by co-writer Ian Gillan and released on his Cherkazoo album.

Personnel
John Cann – guitar, cello, vocals on tracks 1, 8 & 11
John Gustafson – bass guitar, keyboards, vocals on tracks 2, 4, 7, 9 & 12
Paul Hammond – drums, percussion
Harry Shaw – vocals (uncredited) on tracks 3, 5, 6 & 10
Tony Burrett – cover photo
Louie Austin – engineer

References

External links
jamesons-pattaya.com/mottthedog/reviews Mott The Dog CD reviews
Bulletproof on Discogs

Hard Stuff albums
1972 albums
Purple Records albums
Harvest Records albums
Angel Air albums